Chellal District is a district of M'Sila Province, Algeria.

Municipalities
The district is further divided into 4 municipalities:
Chellal
Ouled Madhi
Khettouti Sed El Djir
Maarif

District of M'Sila Province